The Judo competition of the 2016 Summer Paralympics was held in Hall 3 at the Carioca Arena  inside the Olympic Training Center in Barra cluster between 8 and 10 September. There were 13 events, corresponding to seven weight classes for men and six for women, and a  total of 132 athletes will compete. At the Paralympics, judo is contested by visually impaired athletes.

Qualification 

Qualification will be largely based on the world ranking list prepared by International Blind Sports Federation as of May 30, 2016. A total of 114 athletes will directly qualify through the ranking with only the top 9 men or top 6 women in each division, ensuring that each NPC is subjected to a limit of one judoka per division.

In addition, a quota place will be reserved in each weight category for the host nation, and a place will also be reserved for the NPC of the winners of each weight division at the 2014 IBSA World Championships. finally, the Bipartite Commission will also make one invite per weight division, to complete the field.

Qualification summary

Medal summary

Medal table

Men's events

Women's events

References

External links
 

 
2016
2016 Summer Paralympics events
Paralympics
Judo competitions in Brazil